is a railway station in Nan'yō, Yamagata, Japan, operated by the Yamagata Railway.

Lines
Minami-Nagai Station is a station on the Flower Nagai Line, and is located 6.8 rail kilometers (about 4 rail miles) from the terminus of the line at Akayu Station.

Station layout
Minami-Nagai Station has a single side platform serving traffic in both directions.  The station is unattended.

Adjacent stations

History
Minami-Nagai Station opened on 20 May 1960.

Surrounding area
 Nagai Summary Court
  National Route 287

External links
  Flower Nagai Line 

Railway stations in Yamagata Prefecture
Yamagata Railway Flower Nagai Line
Railway stations in Japan opened in 1960